Marek Mach may refer to:
 Marek Mach (activist), Slovak activist
 Marek Mach (footballer), Czech footballer